Ambulyx lahora is a species of moth of the  family Sphingidae. It is known from the Himalaya in Pakistan and India.

References

Ambulyx
Moths described in 1875
Moths of Asia